Maksym Borovets (born 15 April 1992) is a professional Ukrainian football midfielder.

Ilchysh is the product of the Sportive School of Dynamo Kyiv. He spent some years for playing in the different the Ukrainian First League clubs.

He signed deal with the Cypriot football club Enosis Neon Paralimni FC in July 2013, but in March of the next year returned in Ukraine.

References

External links

1992 births
Living people
Ukrainian footballers
Ukraine student international footballers
Ukraine youth international footballers
FC Bukovyna Chernivtsi players
FC Poltava players
FC Kolos Kovalivka players
FC Arsenal Kyiv players
NK Veres Rivne players
FC Polissya Zhytomyr players
FC Kudrivka players
Association football midfielders
Expatriate footballers in Cyprus
Cypriot First Division players
Enosis Neon Paralimni FC players
Ukrainian expatriate footballers
Ukrainian expatriate sportspeople in Cyprus
Association football defenders
Ukrainian Second League players